Kladanj is a town and municipality located in Tuzla Canton of the Federation of Bosnia and Herzegovina, an entity of Bosnia and Herzegovina. Kladanj is located on road from Tuzla to Sarajevo along the river Drinjača, at the base of Konjuh mountain.

History
The first mention of the town of Kladanj dates back to 1138.

The first record of Kladanj in Turkish sources is from 1469, referring to the market place Četvrtkovište where on Thursdays big fairs were held. In the period of Ottoman rule, Kladanj was mentioned in 1557, as a settlement (kasaba) within the Sarajevo kadiluk (territorial unit) that would further on become a kadiluk itself with Olovo as its part.

Settlements
• Brateljevići
• Brdijelji
• Brgule
• Brlošci
• Buševo
• Crijevčići
• Dole
• Gojakovići
• Gojsalići
• Goletići
• Jelačići
• Jošje
• Kladanj
• Konjevići
• Kovačići
• Krivajevići
• Lupoglavo
• Majdan
• Mala Kula
• Matijevići
• Mladovo
• Noćajevići
• Novo Naselje - Stupari
• Obrćevac
• Olovci
• Pauč
• Pelemiši
• Pepići
• Plahovići
• Prijanovići
• Prijevor
• Ravne
• Rujići
• Starić
• Stupari - Centar
• Stupari - Selo
• Suljići
• Tarevo
• Tuholj
• Velika Kula
• Vranovići
• Vučinići
• Zagrađe

Demographics

1971
14,015 total
Bosniaks - 9,300 (66.35%)
Serbs - 4,487 (32.01%)
Croats - 66 (0.47%)
Yugoslavs - 63 (0.44%)
others - 99 (0.73%)

1991
16,070 total
Bosniaks - 11,621

Demographic 2013 Census 

According to the 2013 census, the population of the town was 4,026.

Geography
The town is 570 meters above sea level.

Economy
The lumber industry called "Sokolina" is one of the most vital economic contributors to the municipality.

Notable people
Sulejman Kupusović, film director
Mirko Pejanović, member of the Presidency of the Republic of Bosnia and Herzegovina, as well as professor and dean of the Faculty of Political Sciences in Sarajevo
Akif Šeremet, founder and secretary of the LCY
Avdaga Hasić, leader of the local militia "Avdaga's legion"
Senahid Halilović, professor of dialectology and author of "The Orthography of the Bosnian language"
Vahid Kljajić, professor emeritus and dean of the Faculty of Political Sciences in Sarajevo

References

External links

 Kladanj Forumer

Cities and towns in the Federation of Bosnia and Herzegovina
Populated places in Kladanj
Municipalities of the Tuzla Canton